You Don't Know Me: Classic Country (or informally referred to as You Don't Know Me) is the twenty sixth studio album by American country artist Crystal Gayle. The record was released on September 6, 2019 via Southpaw Musical Productions and The Orchard. You Don't Know Me contains cover versions of classic country songs and features collaborations with other artists. The album marks Gayle's first studio release in 16 years.

Background
The album has been in the making for several years. In a 2017 interview, Gayle stated intentions to record an album of classic country material. The project was first titled Am I That Easy to Forget. You Don't Know Me was co-produced by Gayle and her son, Christos Gatzimos. The album consists of 14 classic country songs, including the title track. The latter was written by Cindy Walker and recorded by Eddy Arnold in 1955.

You Don't Know Me also includes cover versions of songs originally recorded by artists such as Patsy Cline, George Jones and Buck Owens. The album's lead single is the opening track "Ribbon of Darkness". The song was originally made successful in the United States by Marty Robbins, and later on by Connie Smith. "Ribbon of Darkness" was the first song Gayle performed on the Grand Ole Opry. The album's fourteenth track "Put It Off Until Tomorrow" features Gayle's siblings Loretta Lynn and Peggy Sue. It is the first time the siblings have recorded together.

Gayle recorded the album because she wanted to pay tribute to the music she was raised singing. In an interview with Music Row she commented, "It is filled with country classics that I grew up singing. They are very much a part of my history and I’ve been wanting to do this for a long time. I feel very lucky to have known and worked with many of the artists who had the original hits." She also wanted to record the album to expose Gatzimos to classic country music. In an interview with CMT Gayle explained, "I really started out the project with letting Christos see and hear what country music is really all about."

Critical reception

You Don't Know Me has received positive reviews from music critics and journalists. Stephen Thomas Erlewine of Allmusic gave the release 3 out of 5 stars, calling the production style "clean, precise, and spotless". Erlewine also noted that Gayle's upper register has "diminished" but is nonetheless "amiable". Erlewine would conclude his review by saying, "While the crisp sonics prevent You Don't Know Me from being as welcoming as a faded, familiar wrap, the intent is nevertheless appreciated and it's good to hear Gayle sound so engaged with the songs she is singing."

Markos Papadatos of the Digital Journal gave the album an "A" rating. He called Gayle's voice "rich" and "crystalline". To conclude, Papadatos said, "Overall, Crystal Gayle is sensational on her new album, You Don't Know Me, which is country as grits. Grab a bottle of wine and let this country queen lure you in with her timeless voice. Every song is polished and unique." Nancy Kruh of People praised Gayle's voice, calling it "smooth" and "silky".

Commercial performance
In promotion of You Don't Know Me, the opening track "Ribbon of Darkness" was released as a digital download. The album was available for pre-ordering in August 2019. Although the album was released on Southpaw Musical Productions, it was distributed by BFD and The Orchard. Upon release, You Don't Know Me became Gayle's first studio album release to make a chart appearance since 1988. The album peaked at number 40 on the Billboard Top Independent Albums chart and number 27 on the Billboard Country Albums Sales chart.

The album has sold 1,900 copies in the United States as of November 2019.

Track listing

Personnel
All credits are adapted from Allmusic.

Musical personnel

 Vickie Carrico – background vocals
 Billy Contreras – fiddle
 Jim Ferguson – background vocals
 Crystal Gayle – lead vocals, background vocals
 John Hobbs – piano
 Beth Hooker – background vocals
 Mike Johnson – steel guitar
 Chris Leuzinger – electric guitar
 Mike Loudermilk – acoustic guitar, electric guitar
 Loretta Lynn – background vocals

 Duane Norman – drums
 Mark Prentice – bass
 Rob Price – bass
 Mark Rojas – piano, synthesizer
 Mike Severs – acoustic guitar
 David Spicher – bass
 Harry Stinson – background vocals
 Peggy Sue – background vocals
 Chris Walters – piano
 Lonnie Wilson – drums

Creative
 Cat Gatzimos – artwork
 Alexander Giavis – artwork
 Gor Megaera – cover photo

Technical
 Christos Gatzimos – engineering, mixing, producer
 Crystal Gayle – producer
 Charlie Johns – engineering
 Eric Prestidge – engineering
 Justin Shturtz – mastering
 Bill Walker – conductor, string arrangements

Chart performance

Release history

References

External links
 "You Don't Know Me" on Amazon

2019 albums
Crystal Gayle albums
Albums produced by Crystal Gayle
Covers albums